Sørensen is a Danish-Norwegian patronymic surname meaning "son of Søren" (given name equivalent of Severin). , it is the eighth most common surname in Denmark. Immigrants to English-speaking countries often changed the spelling to Sorensen or Sorenson in order to accommodate English orthographic rules. English-language media often similarly renders Sørensen as either Sorensen or Sorenson. A parallel form of similar origin is Severinsen.

The numbers of bearers of the surnames Sørensen and Severinsen in Denmark and Norway (2008):

It may refer to a number of people:

People with the same name
Ole Sørensen
Peter Sørensen

In sports
Aksel Sørensen (1891-1955), Danish gymnast
Andreas Sørensen (born 1984), Danish footballer
Arne Sørensen (1917-1977), Danish footballer and manager
Asger Sørensen (born 1996), Danish footballer
Chris Sørensen (born 1977), Danish footballer
Chris Anker Sørensen (1984-2021), Danish cyclist
Dennis Sørensen (born 1981)Danish footballer
Egon Sørensen (1913-1981), Danish football goalkeeper
Erling Sørensen (1920-2002), Danish footballer
Ernst Sørensen (chess player), Danish chess player
Finn Willy Sørensen (1941-2019), Danish football player
Frederik Sørensen (born 1992), Danish football player
Hans Christian Sørensen (1900-1984), Danish gymnast
Hans Olav Sørensen (born 1942), Norwegian ski jumper
Hans Laurids Sørensen (1901-1974), Danish gymnast
Harry Sørensen (1892-1963), Danish gymnast
Henning Lund-Sørensen (born 1942), retired Danish footballer
Inge Sørensen (1924-2011), Danish swimmer
Jacob Sørensen (born 1983), Danish footballer
Jan Sørensen (born 1955), Danish footballer
Jan-Derek Sørensen (born 1971), Norwegian footballer
Jens-Kristian Sørensen (born 1987), Danish footballer
Jesper Sørensen (born 1973), Danish footballer
Jørgen Leschly Sørensen (1922-1999), Danish footballer
Jørn Sørensen (born 1936), Danish footballer
Karina Sørensen (born 1980), Danish badminton player
Karsten Sørensen (born 1948), Danish handball player
Kenneth Sørensen (born 1982), Danish footballer
Lars Sørensen (swimmer) (born 1968), Danish swimmer
Mette Sørensen (born 1975), Danish badminton player
Nicki Sørensen (born 1975), Danish cyclist
Niels Holst-Sørensen (born 1922), Danish athlete
Odd Wang Sørensen (1922-2004), Norwegian footballer
Ole Nørskov Sørensen (born 1952), Danish handball player
Poul Sørensen (1906-1951), Danish cyclist
Poul Sørensen (born 1954), Danish handball player
Rolf Sørensen (born 1965), Danish cyclist
Søren Sørensen (1897-1965), Danish gymnast
Thomas Sørensen (born 1976), Danish football goalkeeper
Tommy Sørensen (born 1979), Danish badminton player

In the arts
Bent Sørensen (born 1958), Danish composer
Birgitte Hjort Sørensen (born 1982), Danish actress
 Birte Tove Sørensen (1945–2016), birth name of Birte Tove, Danish actress and nude model
Carl Theodor Sørensen (1893-1979), Danish landscape architect
Sisters Heidi and Line Sørensen, members of Danish pop group S.O.A.P.
Ingeborg Sørensen (born 1948), Norwegian model
John Sorensen (born 1934), Guitarist, recording engineer, producer and lawyer
Per Øystein Sørensen (born 1961), musician
Sigurd Torbjørn Sørensen (1901-1981), Norwegian artist
Svend-Allan Sørensen (born 1975), Danish artist
Villy Sørensen (1929-2001), Danish author

In politics
Edvard Sørensen (1893-1954), Danish politician
Enevold Frederik Adolf Sørensen (1850-1920), Danish editor and politician
Frode Sørensen (born 1946), Danish politician
Hans Peter Sørensen (1886–1962), Danish politician
Heidi Sørensen (born 1970), Norwegian politician
Olaf Sørensen (1892-1962), Norwegian politician
Ronald Sørensen (born 1947), Dutch politician (Norwegian descent)

In other media
Elsa Sørensen (1934-2016), Danish model
Jan Vang Sørensen (born c. 1960), previously named Jan Vang Hansen, Danish poker player
Palle Sørensen (1927-2018), Danish criminal

In military
Niels Holst-Sørensen (born 1922), commander-in-chief of the Royal Danish Air Force

In science
Bent Erik Sørensen (born 1941), Danish physicist and researcher into renewable energy
Søren Sørensen (chemist) (1868-1939), Danish biochemist
Thorvald Sørensen (1902-1973), Danish botanist

People with Sørensen in their name
Anders Sørensen Vedel (1542-1616), Danish priest and historian
Christen Sørensen Longomontanus (1562-1647), Danish astronomer
Peter Sørensen Vig (1854-1929), Danish-American pastor

Other uses
Kuffert Sørensen, leather goods company

Severinsen
Doc Severinsen (born 1927), American pop and jazz trumpeter
Al Severinsen (born 1927), American baseball player

See also
Sorensen

References

Danish-language surnames
Norwegian-language surnames
Patronymic surnames